Padrón is a surname of Hispanic origin. Its origin is from the Galician town of Padrón.

There are currently 4,729 people in Spain with the surname Padrón.

List of persons with the surname
Bernardo Padrón (contemporary), Venezuelan saxophonist and composer
Eduardo J. Padrón (contemporary), American academic and college president
Frank Padrón (born 1958), Cuban film critic
Humberto Padrón (born 1967), Cuban film director
José Padrón (1906–1944), Spanish professional football player
Juan Padrón (born 1947), Cuban premier animation director
Julián Padrón (1910–1954), Venezuelan writer, journalist and lawyer
Justo Jorge Padrón (1943–2021), Canarian Spanish poet
Leo Padron, American watchmaker

See also Padrón peppers

References

Galician-language surnames